is a former Japanese football player. She has played for Japan national team.

Club career
Kawamura was born in Niigata on 17 May 1989. She played for her local club Albirex Niigata from 2004 to 2012. She moved to JEF United Chiba in 2013 and Vegalta Sendai in 2014. She was selected Best Eleven in 2015 and 2016. In 2017, she returned to Albirex Niigata.

On 4 April 2017, the North Carolina Courage signed Kawamura before the start of their first season in the National Women's Soccer League. She appeared in 8 matches, starting 7, as a defender before tearing her ACL and meniscus on 1 June 2017, in a match against the Chicago Red Stars. The injury required surgery, and the Courage placed Kawamura on the season-ending injury list.

After recovering for injury Kawamura made her 2018 season debut on 3 June against the Houston Dash. Kawamura suffered another ACL tear on 29 July during the final of the 2018 Women's International Champions Cup ending her season early due to injury for the second straight year. The Courage subsequently did not renew her contract, and no NWSL teams claimed her rights from the re-entry wire.

National team career
On 13 January 2010, Kawamura debuted for Japan national team against Denmark. She was a member of Japan for 2014 Asian Cup and 2015 World Cup. Japan won the championship at 2014 Asian Cup and 2nd place at 2015 World Cup. She played 32 games and scored 2 goals for Japan until 2017.

National team statistics

Honours

International
Japan
 AFC Women's Asian Cup: 2014

Club
North Carolina Courage
NWSL Champions: 2018
NWSL Shield: 2017, 2018

References

External links

 

Japan Football Association
 North Carolina Courage player profile

1989 births
Living people
Niigata University of Health and Welfare alumni
Association football people from Niigata Prefecture
Japanese women's footballers
Japan women's international footballers
Nadeshiko League players
National Women's Soccer League players
Albirex Niigata Ladies players
JEF United Chiba Ladies players
Mynavi Vegalta Sendai Ladies players
North Carolina Courage players
Expatriate women's soccer players in the United States
Japanese expatriate sportspeople in the United States
2015 FIFA Women's World Cup players
Women's association football midfielders
Japanese expatriate women's footballers